Ali Eyigun (born 26 September 1997) is an Australian professional footballer who plays as a midfielder for Pascoe Vale in the National Premier Leagues.

References

External links
 

1997 births
Living people
Association football midfielders
Australian soccer players
Melbourne City FC players
A-League Men players
National Premier Leagues players
Soccer players from Melbourne
Australian people of Turkish descent